The Sadh is a minority Bhakti-era Hindu sect in India. It is a monotheistic Hindu sect where its followers believe in a formless and supreme god called Satnam Satpurush.

According to M. A. Sherring, he may have been influenced by the teachings of Ravidas. This sect is thought to be an offshoot of Ravidasi sect and composed of lower strata of the Hindu society

Religious context 

 
Vaishnavism has following four sects: 
 Sri founded by Ramananda
 Brahma founded by Madhava 
 Ridra founded by Vishnusuvamin
 Sanakadi founded by Nimbarka
Followers of Vaishnavism are also called Bairagi or Vairagi. Among the Bairagi, those who became part of the military akharas were organised in the 7 akharas founding dates of most of which are unclear. Each of the akhara accepted members from all 4 sects of vaishnavism. Bairagi military akharas generally did not follow the prohibition against eating meat or taking of narcotics. Satnamis and Dadupanthis are 2 of those martial akharas or orders of  Bairagis.

Foundation of Sadh sect 
The sect was formed by Birbhan sadhji in Bijesar, a village near Narnaul, Haryana in the year 1543 CE. They use the name Satnami to call upon the God. Hence, they call themselves as Satnamis. Group or gathering of Sadh's is pronounced as "Sangat" संगत.

History
The sect was formed by Birbhan Sadh in Bijesar, a village near Narnaul, Haryana in the year 1543 CE. They use the name satnami to call upon God and thus call themselves satnamis. Group or gathering of Sadh's is pronounced as "sangat" (association). 
.

See also
 Jagjivan Das
 Sant Kabir
 Guru Ravidas
 Guru Ghasidas

References

Hindu denominations
Bhakti-era Hindu sects
Social groups of Uttar Pradesh
Indian castes
Weaving communities of South Asia
Dalit communities
Satnami
Scheduled Castes of Uttar Pradesh
Scheduled Castes of Haryana